Lin Der-chang is a Taiwanese judoka. He completed in the 86 kg men's judo event at the 1992 Summer Paralympics, where he earned a bronze medal.

References

Year of birth missing (living people)
Living people
Taiwanese male judoka
Paralympic judoka of Chinese Taipei
Judoka at the 1992 Summer Paralympics
Paralympic bronze medalists for Chinese Taipei
Medalists at the 1992 Summer Paralympics
20th-century Taiwanese people